"Art for Arts Sake" is a single by 10cc released in 1975. It was taken from the How Dare You! album, and reached No. 5 on the UK singles chart.

The title of the song derives from the fact that Graham Gouldman's father, Hymie Gouldman, often used to say "Art for art's sake, money for God's sake, okay".

Record World called it "a spirited tour-de-force of vocal and production technique with an irresistible hook" and "a great sound."

Personnel
 Eric Stewart – lead vocal, grand piano, electric piano, six string bass, fuzz bass, lead guitar
 Graham Gouldman– electric guitars, cow bell, tambourine, backing vocals
 Lol Creme – 2nd lead vocal, electric guitars, maracas, Moog synthesizer, recorder, backing vocals
 Kevin Godley – drums, temple blocks, backing vocals

Chart performance

Weekly charts

Year-end charts

References

10cc songs
1975 singles
Songs written by Eric Stewart
Songs written by Graham Gouldman
Mercury Records singles
1975 songs